Black Opals was an African American literary journal published in Philadelphia between spring 1927 and July 1928, associated with the Harlem Renaissance.

Co-founded by Arthur Huff Fauset and Nellie Rathbone Bright, the magazine's contributors included Mae Virginia Cowdery, Jessie Redmon Fauset, Marita Bonner, and Gwendolyn B. Bennett. Allan Randall Freelon was the magazine's artistic director.

References

Magazines established in 1927
Magazines disestablished in 1928
1927 establishments in Pennsylvania
1928 disestablishments in Pennsylvania
Defunct literary magazines published in the United States
Magazines published in Philadelphia
African-American history in Philadelphia
Harlem Renaissance